Mark Waters (born 1964) is an American film director.

Mark Waters may also refer to:

See also
 Mark Walters (born 1964), English footballer
 Mark Walters (cyclist) (born 1976), Canadian former cyclist
 Mark Watters (born 1955), music composer